Reilly Creek is a tributary of Creasy Creek in Luzerne County, Pennsylvania, in the United States. Reilly Creek has one named tributary, which is known as Mill Creek. The creek is slightly acidic, but has some alkalinity and water hardness. It is relatively unlikely that the creek will experience water pollution. The main rock formations in the vicinity of the creek include the Mauch Chunk Formation and the Pocono Formation. The creek is considered to be a Coldwater Fishery.

Course
Reilly Creek begins a short distance northwest of Bear Creek Junction in Dennison Township. It flows southwest for several tenths of a mile before turning west-southwest for nearly two miles (three kilometers). The creek then turns southwest for a few tenths of a mile and receives the tributary Mill Creek from the left. After receiving this tributary, Reilly Creek turns northwest and after several tenths of a mile reaches its confluence with Creasy Creek.

Hydrology
Reilly Creek is slightly acidic, with a pH of 6.4. The concentration of alkalinity in the creek is 22 milligrams per liter and the concentration of water hardness is 28 milligrams per liter. The specific conductance of the creek's waters is 97 micromohs.

The DRASTIC score for the upper reaches of the Nescopeck Creek watershed, where Reilly Creek is located, ranges between 69 and 90. This indicates a relatively low probability of water pollution.

Geography and geology

Reilly Creek is considerably shorter than its tributary, Mill Creek.

Rock of the Mauch Chunk Formation (which contains the most productive aquifers in the area of Nescopeck Creek) and the Pocono Formation occurs in or near the watershed of Reilly Creek. Several water wells are in the vicinity of the watershed.

Watershed
The mouth of Reilly Creek is in the United States Geological Survey quadrangle of White Haven, as is the source of the creek. The watershed of the creek is in the northeastern part of the watershed of Nescopeck Creek. Adjacent watersheds include those of Mill Creek and Creasy Creek.

There are only a few miles of local roads in the watershed of Reilly Creek. There are even fewer state roads in the watershed of the creek. The creek is one of six streams in the upper Nescopeck Creek watershed to have considerably more than 80 percent forest coverage.

History
Reilly Creek was entered into the Geographic Names Information System on August 2, 1979. Its identifier in the Geographic Names Information System is 1184879 and it is described as a "2 mile long tributary of Nescopeck Creek".

The Pennsylvania Fish and Boat Commission has a water quality sampling station on Reilly Creek.

Biology
Reilly Creek is considered by the Pennsylvania Department of Environmental Protection to be a Coldwater Fishery. The creek is the only part of the drainage basin of Creasy Creek that is not considered to be a High-Quality Coldwater Fishery and Class A Wild Trout Waters.

See also
List of rivers of Pennsylvania

Notes

References

Rivers of Luzerne County, Pennsylvania
Rivers of Pennsylvania
Tributaries of Nescopeck Creek